Chah Sahari (also Romanized as Chāh Şaḩārī; also known as Chāh Sārī) is a village in Khamir Rural District, in the Central District of Khamir County, Hormozgan Province, Iran. At the 2006 census, its population was 346, in 69 families.

References 

Populated places in Khamir County